This article attempts to list the oldest extant buildings in the state of Alabama in the United States. Some dates are approximate and based upon dendochronology, architectural studies, and historical records. The area that is now Alabama was originally inhabited by Native Americans. The settlement of Mobile began in 1702 as the first capital of the colony of French Louisiana, and the region was colonized and traded between French, British, Spanish, and American forces during the 1700s. No documented buildings remain standing in the state from this period, though Fort Toulouse has been accurately reconstructed. There is one remaining example nearby, the 1757 french colonial LaPointe-Krebs House in Pascagoula, Mississippi.  The oldest existing structures within the state reflect a wave of American settlement into the Tennessee River valley, including the establishment of Huntsville in 1805.

To be listed here a site must:
date to Alabama statehood in 1819 or prior; or
be the oldest building in a region, large city, or oldest of its type (government building, style, etc.)

List

Demolished early Alabama buildings
Issac Bett House, Burnt Corn Alabama

The existing house once located at 308 Conti Street (now moved) in Mobile may contain portions of a 1796 structure.

Sandy Hill Plantation

The Oaks

Shelby Hotel

See also
List of the oldest buildings in the United States
History of Alabama
List of the oldest buildings in Florida
List of the oldest buildings in Georgia
List of the oldest buildings in Mississippi
List of the oldest buildings in Tennessee
Timeline of architectural styles
List of National Historic Landmarks in Alabama
National Register of Historic Places listings in Alabama
Alabama Register of Landmarks and Heritage

References

External links
 The Alabama Historical Commission Website

History of Alabama
Alabama

Oldest